Paulo Roberto Orlando  (born November 1, 1985) is a Brazilian professional baseball outfielder who is a free agent. He previously played in Major League Baseball (MLB) for the Kansas City Royals. He represented Brazil at the 2013 World Baseball Classic.

Early life
Paulo Orlando was born in São Paulo, Brazil. His mother is a nurse. When Orlando was 12 years old, a Japanese-Brazilian physician who worked with Orlando's mother recommended that he try his hand at baseball, an obscure sport primarily played by the Japanese community in Brazil. Orlando was nicknamed "gaijin" by teammates because he was one of so few players who was not of Japanese descent. Because baseball fields were so few, Orlando could only play baseball on weekends. He relied mostly on his speed and was not among the best players on his youth teams. However, as was typical in Brazil, most of his teammates abandoned the sport as they got older.

Growing up, in addition to baseball, he played association football (soccer). In his early teens, he also took up track and field. He ran the 200-meter sprint in 21 seconds and the 400-meter dash in 46.36 seconds for the Brazilian Youth Olympic team. In 2005, he quit track to focus on baseball; he began playing in the Dominican Republic and Venezuela.

Professional career

Chicago White Sox
Orlando was discovered and signed by a Cuban scout for the Chicago White Sox in 2005. He was named the fastest base runner in the White Sox system for the 2006 and 2007 seasons, as well as best defensive outfielder for the 2007 season.

Kansas City Royals
Orlando was traded to the Royals on August 9, 2008 in exchange for pitcher Horacio Ramírez. He led the Carolina League in triples in 2008 while playing for Winston-Salem in the White Sox system and Wilmington in the Royals system. In 2010 with the Northwest Arkansas Naturals, he hit .305 with 13 homers, 64 RBI and 25 steals to earn Texas League All-Star honors. There was some talk that he would be added to the Royals' 40-man roster after the season, but a poor showing in the Puerto Rican winter league left him off the roster. He became the third Brazilian-born player, and first non-pitcher, to make it to Triple-A when he was promoted to the Omaha Storm Chasers to start 2011. He returned to the Northwest Arkansas Naturals in mid-2011 through 2012, then played for the Omaha Storm Chasers in 2013 and 2014. In 2014, he was named the fastest base runner in the Pacific Coast League. In all, he played 1,017 minor league games.

2015

After the 2014 season, Orlando was added to the Royals 40-man roster. He made the Royals opening day roster in 2015 and made his major league debut on April 9, becoming the third Brazilian-born player in MLB history. His first major league hit, a triple off Chicago White Sox pitcher John Danks, was also the first MLB hit for a born-and-raised Brazilian player. Three days later, Orlando became the first player in MLB history to record three triples as his first three base hits. On April 20, Orlando hit his fifth triple in his first seven games, establishing a new major league record for "the fewest games to hit five triples to open a career".

On May 26, Orlando hit his first major league home run in a game against the New York Yankees. On July 7, Orlando hit a walk-off grand slam against Brad Boxberger of the Tampa Bay Rays in the first game of a double-header; it was his second career home run and first-ever grand slam. He was optioned to Omaha Storm Chasers on July 29 to make room for Ben Zobrist.

He became the first Brazilian-born player to win a World Series on November 1, 2015.

2016
Prior to the start of the 2016 season, Orlando and Jarrod Dyson were considered most likely to platoon in right field, though the Royals announced plans for an open competition in spring training. He ended up playing the majority of the season as the right fielder for the Royals, playing in 105 games and hitting .302 with 5 home runs and 43 RBI's.

2017
The 2017 season was a rough one for Orlando as he struggled with inconsistency and injury, hitting just .198 in 39 games.

2018
Orlando was designated for assignment after the season, he elected free agency on November 3, 2018.

Los Angeles Dodgers
On January 4, 2019, Orlando signed a minor league contract with the Los Angeles Dodgers that included an invitation to spring training. He hit .211 in 24 games for the AAA Oklahoma City Dodgers.

Chicago White Sox (second stint)
On May 10, 2019, he was traded to the Chicago White Sox. Orlando was released by the White Sox on August 19, 2019.

Tecolotes de los Dos Laredos
On March 12, 2020, Orlando signed with the Somerset Patriots of the Atlantic League of Professional Baseball. He didn't appear in a game for the club, as the season was canceled due to the COVID-19 pandemic. On July 3, 2020, Orlando's contract was purchased by the Tecolotes de los Dos Laredos of the Mexican League for the 2021 season. Orlando hit .250 in 11 games before being released on June 4, 2021.

El Águila de Veracruz
On June 5, 2021, Orlando signed with El Águila de Veracruz of the Mexican League. In 50 games, Orlando slashed .326/.385/.460 with 6 home runs and 34 RBIs.

Kansas City Monarchs
On August 28, 2021, Orlando was loaned to the Kansas City Monarchs of the American Association of Professional Baseball. Orlando and the Monarchs won the 2021 American Association championship series over the Fargo-Moorhead RedHawks. In 8 games he slashed .240/.333/.280 with 0 home runs and 2 RBIs.

On January 29, 2022, Orlando was returned back to El Águila de Veracruz of the Mexican League and officially signed with the team. However, he was released prior to the season on April 18, 2022, after suffering an injury in spring training.

Personal life
Orlando and his wife Fabricia, who have a daughter and a son, live in São Paulo all-year-round, except for part of the time when he lives in Olathe, a suburb of Kansas City.

References

External links

1985 births
Living people
2013 World Baseball Classic players
Brazilian baseball players
Brazilian expatriate baseball players in Mexico
Brazilian expatriate baseball players in the United States
Cardenales de Lara players
Brazilian expatriate baseball players in Venezuela
Charlotte Knights players
El Águila de Veracruz players
Kansas City Royals players
Kannapolis Intimidators players
Major League Baseball players from Brazil
Northwest Arkansas Naturals players
Oklahoma City Dodgers players
Omaha Storm Chasers players
Senadores de San Juan players
Expatriate baseball players in Puerto Rico
Sportspeople from São Paulo
Tecolotes de los Dos Laredos players
Winston-Salem Warthogs players
Wilmington Blue Rocks players
Yaquis de Obregón players